South Wales was a European Parliament constituency covering south central Wales, including the city of Cardiff.

Prior to its uniform adoption of proportional representation in 1999, the United Kingdom used first-past-the-post for the European elections in England, Scotland and Wales. The European Parliament constituencies used under that system were smaller than the later regional constituencies and only had one Member of the European Parliament each.

The constituency was replaced by most of South Wales Central and part of South Wales West in 1994.  These seats became part of the much larger Wales constituency in 1999.

Boundaries
1979-1984: Aberavon, Barry, Cardiff North, Cardiff North West, Cardiff South East, Cardiff West, Neath, Ogmore, Pontypridd.

1984-1994: Aberavon, Bridgend, Cardiff Central, Cardiff North, Cardiff South and Penarth, Cardiff West, Ogmore, Pontypridd, Vale of Glamorgan.

Members of the European Parliament

Results

References

External links
 David Boothroyd's United Kingdom Election Results

European Parliament constituencies in Wales (1979–1999)
1979 establishments in Wales
1994 disestablishments in Wales
Constituencies established in 1979
Constituencies disestablished in 1994